La Tuque station is a Via Rail station in La Tuque, Quebec, Canada. It is located on Rue St-Louis and is staffed.

External links

Via Rail stations in Quebec
Railway stations in Mauricie
La Tuque, Quebec